Pagidipall railway station (station code:PGDP), is a railway junction located near Bibinagar in Nalgonda district where Nadikudi line meets Secunderabad–Kazipet line.

References 

Railway stations in Nalgonda district